Heikki Anton Turunen (born 9 December 1945) is a Finnish author who lives in Joensuu. 

He was born in Pielisjärvi, North Karelia, and grew up with his six sisters in a farming family. In 1964 he got a job as a journalist at Karjalan Maa newspaper in Joensuu. He kept this job until 1974, in the last year, as editor. 

Turunen's writing deals with Finland in the time in which he grew up, before urbanisation, industrialisation, and tenant farmers. He often describes characters who are a little unusual. Many of his books have been filmed.

Bibliography
Simpauttaja (1973; J. H. Erkko Award) 
Joensuun Elli (1974) 
Kivenpyörittäjän kylä (1976)
Hupeli (1978) 
Soakkunoita susirajalta (1979) 
Kolmen hevosen mies (1981) 
Punahongan hehku (1982) 
Mustarinnan lapset (1985) 
Maan veri (1987) 
Turusen pyssystä (1988) 
Karhunpäinen metsänvartija (1992) 
Maalainen (1994) 
Hojo, hojo (1995) 
Seitsemän kurvin suora (1998) 
Kaikkitietävän tasavalta (2000) 
Jumalan piika (2002) 
Orpopojan valssi (2003) 
Yö kevään kuun, (2005) 
Pohjoinen ulottuvuus (2007)

References

1945 births
Living people
People from Lieksa
Writers from North Karelia
Finnish writers